Benivar-e Sofla (also Romanized as Benīvār-e Soflá; also known as Benvār-e Soflá, Bonvār-e Pā’īn, and Bonvār-e Soflá) is a village in Jarahi Rural District, in the Central District of Mahshahr County, Khuzestan Province, Iran. At the 2006 census, its population was 271, in 50 families.

References 

Populated places in Mahshahr County